Qaum is the Arabic word for nation. It may refer to a community of people who share a common language, culture, ethnicity, descent, and/or history. In this definition, a nation has no physical borders. However, it can also refer to people who share a common territory and government (for example the inhabitants of a sovereign state) irrespective of their ethnic make-up. The protean word Qawm is of Arabic origin, and is used to refer to any form of solidarity.

See also
Nation
Qawm

References

Ethnicity
Nation
Pakistani words and phrases
Arabic words and phrases